Sombre Romantic is the debut studio album from Australian gothic metal band Virgin Black. The album was originally released on 14 October 2000 in a very limited pressing within Australia only by Crestfallen Records. It was then re-released on 12 February 2001 on The End Records in the United States and in Europe by German label Massacre Records. A 2002 re-pressing of this album by The End also included the Trance EP as a bonus disk. In 2021, Virgin Black signed the first official worldwide streaming release of Sombre Romantic with the Australian distributor Dark Escapes Music.

Track listing
 "Opera de Romanci I. - Stare" - 3:57
 "Opera de Romanci II. - Embrace" - 3:52
 "Walk Without Limbs" - 4:26
 "Of Your Beauty" - 4:00
 "Drink the Midnight Hymn" - 5:14
 "Museum of Iscariot" - 7:41
 "Lamenting Kiss" - 5:25
 "Weep for Me" - 1:52
 "I Sleep with the Emperor" - 2:40
 "A Poet's Tears of Porcelain" - 5:20
 "Outro" - 0:11 *

* hidden track

Credits
Samantha Escarbe - lead guitar
Rowan London - lead vocals, keyboards, piano
Craig Edis - vocals, guitar
Dino Cielo - drums
Ian Miller - bass, vocals
Aaron Nicholls - bass
Chris Handley (guest) - cello

References

External links
Encyclopaedia Metallum - Virgin Black - Sombre Romantic retrieved 10-1-07

2001 debut albums
The End Records albums
Virgin Black albums